The Studio is a 1969 non-fiction book by John Gregory Dunne about the workings at 20th Century Fox from May 1967 to May 1968. He was allowed significant access to the studio over several months.

According to Dunne's obituary, the resulting book "is regarded as one of the most detailed and accurate reports on the workings of a major film studio ever written."

It covers such aspects as:
the test screening and marketing of Doctor Doolittle
the making of Star!, The Planet of the Apes, The Sweet Ride
the scripting of The Boston Strangler

People who appear in the book include Richard Zanuck, Darryl F. Zanuck, Gene Kelly, Paul Monash, Joe Pasternak, Pandro Berman.

Joyce Haber of the Los Angeles Times said, "Dunne's observations are right on the button, his descriptions are spare but evocative, his observations combine substance with humor." In 1969 Charles Champlin called it "the hottest book in movie circles these days". The New York Times said the book was full "of the most awful scenes."

References

1969 non-fiction books
American non-fiction books
Books about films
Farrar, Straus and Giroux books